Bal Sitaram Mardhekar (1 December 1909 – 20 March 1956) was a Marathi writer who brought about a radical shift of sensibility in Marathi poetry. He was born in a town called Faizpur in the Khandesh region of Maharashtra.

He was educated in Pune and London, and worked at All India Radio until his death. His earlier collection of poems, Shishiragam (शिशिरागम), was a product of Ravi Kiran Mandal poetry: sentimental and lyrical. But his later avant-garde poetry brought about a storm in the Marathi literary world. His poem with the title "पिपात मेले ओल्या उंदिर" (Mice Died in the Wet Barrel) appeared in Abhiruchi (अभिरुची) magazine in 1946.

Similar to what Baudelaire did in French poetry, Mardhekar brought a decadent urban ethos into Marathi poetry. Marathi bhakti (भक्ति) poetry and the poetry of T. S. Eliot and W. H. Auden had an influence on him.

In 1948, he was charged and tried for obscenity for some of his poems in Kahi Kavita. He was declared innocent of these charges in 1952.

Mardhekar was also an influential critic and an experimental novelist. He attempted to bring in the consciousness technique in Marathi novels.

He received in 1956 Sahitya Akademi Award for his work Saundarya ani Sahitya (A study of aesthetics) (सौंदर्य आणि साहित्य).

Published works

Books
yes he is a god so

Poetry
 Shishiragam (1939)
 Kahi Kavita (1947)
 Aankhin Kahi Kavita (1951)
 Kiti Tari Divsat
 Ala Ashadh Shravan

Novels
 Raatricha Divas (1942)
 Tambdi Maati (1943)
 Paani (1948)
 Mardhekaranchya Kadambarya (1962)

Aesthetics and Criticism
 Arts and Man (1937)
 Vangmaiyeen Mahaatmata (1941)
 Two Lectures on an Aesthetic of Literature (1944)
 Saundarya ani Sahitya (1955)

Plays
 Karna (1944)
 Natashreshta (1944)
 Sangam (1945)
 Aukshan (1946)
 Badakanche Gupit (1947)

Short Stories
 Natashrestha Appasaheb Rele (1944)

References

Further reading
 Vijaya Rajadhyaksha (विजया राजाध्यक्ष): मर्ढेकरांची कविता. (The book received Sahitya Akademi Award in 1993.)
 Manohar, Yashwant. Baal Sitaram Mardhekar. New Delhi Sahitya Akademi. 1997
 M. V. Dhond: "Tarihi Yeto Vas Phulanna", Publisher- Rajhans Prakashan, Pune 1999
 Deshpande, D.V. Mardhekaranchi Kavita. 1980
 'Aksharanchya Shrama Kela' (2000) by Vilas Sarang
 कारुण्योपनिषद (Karunyopanishad) by Vinay Hardikar
 Manohar, Yashwant. Keshavsut ani Mardhekar: Ek Taulnik Abhyas. 1982 ( a doctoral thesis)

Special Issues on Mardhekar
 Satyakatha May 1956
 Nabhowani. Year 1, Issue 9, March 1971

Translation of Mardhekar's Poetry
 Dilip Chitre. An Anthology of Marathi Poetry (1945-1965)
 Vilas Sarang. Poems of Mardhekar ( For Private Circulation)

Indian male poets
Marathi-language writers
Marathi-language poets
Marathi people
1909 births
1956 deaths
Indian literary critics
Recipients of the Sahitya Akademi Award in Marathi
All India Radio people
20th-century Indian poets
Poets from Maharashtra
20th-century Indian male writers